Chen Dao ( 190s–230s), courtesy name Shuzhi, was a military general of the state of Shu Han in the Three Kingdoms period of China. He previously served under the warlord Liu Bei, the founding emperor of Shu Han, in the late Eastern Han dynasty.

Historical sources on Chen Dao's life
Little is recorded about Chen Dao in history; unlike other notable persons of the late Eastern Han dynasty and Three Kingdoms period, he does not have a biography in the 3rd-century text Records of the Three Kingdoms (Sanguozhi), the authoritative source for that era in Chinese history. Information on him is scattered throughout the biographies of other persons in the Sanguozhi and other sources such as the Chronicles of Huayang (Huayang Guo Zhi) and Taiping Yulan.

Life and career
Chen Dao was from Runan Commandery (汝南郡), which covers parts of present-day southern Henan. He started following the warlord Liu Bei sometime in the 190s when Liu Bei held the appointment of Governor of Yu Province.

Chen Dao served under the Shu Han state, founded by Liu Bei, during the Three Kingdoms period. In the early Jianxing era (223–237) of Liu Shan's reign, he was appointed General Who Attacks the West (征西將軍) and Army Protector (護軍), and awarded the title of a village marquis (亭侯). In 226, when the Shu regent Zhuge Liang was preparing to launch a military campaign against Wei (Shu's rival state), he reassigned the general Li Yan to Jiangzhou (江州; in present-day Chongqing) and put him in charge of logistics. Chen Dao was ordered to replace Li Yan at his previous post in Yong'an County (永安縣; present-day Fengjie County, Chongqing) near the border between Shu and its ally state Wu. Chen must have retired or died by 234 as Deng Zhi was soon stationed there as the new area commander.

Appraisal
Pei Songzhi, who annotated the Sanguozhi in the 5th century, mentioned that Chen Dao was second to the Shu general Zhao Yun in terms of fame and status, and that he exhibited loyalty and courage throughout his life.

Zhuge Liang, the Shu regent from 223 to 234, mentioned in a letter to his brother Zhuge Jin that Chen Dao was the leader of Liu Bei's White Feathers Tent Guards, (白毦兵) which was one of the most elite units in the Shu army at the time.

In Romance of the Three Kingdoms
Chen Dao does not appear in the 14th-century historical novel Romance of the Three Kingdoms, which romanticises the historical figures and events before and during the Three Kingdoms period.

See also
 Lists of people of the Three Kingdoms

References

 Chang, Qu ( 4th century). Chronicles of Huayang (Huayang Guo Zhi).
 Chen, Shou (3rd century). Records of the Three Kingdoms (Sanguozhi).
 Li, Fang (10th century). Taiping Yulan.
 Luo, Guanzhong (14th century). Romance of the Three Kingdoms (Sanguo Yanyi).
 Pei, Songzhi (5th century). Annotations to Records of the Three Kingdoms (Sanguozhi zhu).

Year of birth unknown
Year of death unknown
Shu Han generals
Generals under Liu Bei
Han dynasty generals from Henan